"Overjoyed" is a hit single written and performed by American R&B singer-songwriter Stevie Wonder on the Tamla (Motown) label from his 1985 album In Square Circle. The single peaked at No. 24 on the Billboard Hot 100 chart in early 1986, remaining in the Top 40 for six weeks. In addition, "Overjoyed" was a No. 1 hit on the adult contemporary chart, the eighth (and, to date, last) of his career. An alternate single release featured an instrumental version on the B-side.

The song was written first for the 1979 album Journey Through the Secret Life of Plants, but was left off the album, and re-recorded for the 1985 album In Square Circle. In the liner notes for the song, "crickets, nightingale & additional bird sounds, ocean, pebbles in pond, stone dropped, crushing leaves" are listed under "environmental percussion". The song was first performed live on the May 7, 1983, episode of Saturday Night Live, where Wonder was the host and musical guest.

Billboard said that it "dresses Wonder's usual wordplay in unusual audio effects."

Personnel
 Stevie Wonder – lead vocal, background vocal, acoustic piano, environmental percussion (incl.: crickets, bird sounds, ocean, pebbles in pond, stone dropped, crushing leaves), Yamaha CS-80 synthesizer
 Earl Klugh – guitar
 Paul Riser – string arrangement

Chart positions

Cover versions
 Bassist Stanley Clarke recorded a cover for his 1986 album Hideaway.
 Diana Ross covered it for her 1994 Christmas album, A Very Special Season.
 Mary J. Blige covered it as a rare track on her 2000 Ballads collection released only in Japan. It was used in a mid-1990s Air Jordan commercial, and Blige performed it at the 2000 NBA All-Star Game during the halftime show.
 Jane Monheit included a cover of the song in her 2007 album Surrender.
 Grover Washington Jr. included the song in his 1994 album All My Tomorrows.
 Bass virtuoso Victor Wooten included an instrumental cover of the song on his 1996 album A Show of Hands.
 R&B group Profyle covered the song on their 1999 debut album, Whispers in the Dark.
 Guitarist Blake Aaron covered the song on his 2002 album With Every Touch.
 Belgian-French singer Viktor Lazlo recorded the song for her 2002 album Amour(s).
 In 2009, jazz artist Esperanza Spalding covered the song at the White House at an event to commemorate Stevie Wonder's music.
 Progressive metal guitarist Drewsif Stalin recorded a cover of the song for his 2011 EP, Excursion.
 A version of the song by British pop group Steps appears on their 2012 festive-themed album, Light Up the World.
 In 2011-2014 Canadian singer Celine Dion performed a cover of the song on select dates of her residency show in Las Vegas, Celine as a virtual duet with Stevie Wonder. Wonder appeared alongside Celine Dion singing a new duet cover version on her 2013 studio album Loved Me Back to Life. This version was produced by Tricky Stewart. Jon Maranica of the New York Times called the cover "the most decadent move on the album (Loved Me Back to Life.)  Mr. Wonder, lush and flexible, is the exact opposite of Ms. Dion as a singer. On paper, it's a severe mismatch. But Ms. Dion isn't out of tricks — when Mr. Wonder shimmies, she shimmies back, dodging her own shadow."  Stephen Erlewine of AllMusic noted in his review on the corresponding album that Dion was "expanding to something a little more modern and something with a subtle but palpable R&B undercurrent. This soulful streak surfaces on the duets ('Overjoyed' and 'Incredible.')"
Bassist Nathan East covered the song in 2014 on his self entitled album, Nathan East, with Stevie Wonder himself playing the harmonica.
 Evan McKeel performed a cover of this song during the second night of the live shows of The Voice (USA) season 9, aired November 10, 2015.
 Victory Boyd released album 'It's A New Dawn' on November, 2017, containing cover version of this song.
 In 2019, musician Ben Platt covered the song at his one-night-only concert at Radio City Music Hall.

See also
 List of number-one adult contemporary singles of 1986 (U.S.)

References 

1985 songs
1985 singles
1986 singles
Stevie Wonder songs
Contemporary R&B ballads
Soul ballads
Songs written by Stevie Wonder
Tamla Records singles
1980s ballads
Song recordings produced by Stevie Wonder